In the National Hockey League (NHL), a game seven is the final game in a best-of-seven series in the Stanley Cup playoffs. Based on the playoffs format arrangement, it is played in the venue of the team holding home-ice advantage for the series. The necessity of a game seven cannot be known until the outcome of game six is determined, assuming that a series reaches the sixth game. In other words, game seven is the only one in a best-of-seven series that is not guaranteed more than one game in advance.

The Stanley Cup Finals first employed the best-of-seven format in 1939. The league's semifinals also used the best-of-seven format beginning that same year, as well as the quarterfinal round that was added in 1968. Beginning in 1982, the playoff format was changed from semifinals and quarterfinals, to conference finals and division finals, respectively. A division semifinal round was also added in 1982, but did not begin to use the best-of-seven format until 1987. Starting in 1994, the division final and division semifinal rounds became the conference semifinal and conference quarterfinal rounds, respectively. Beginning with 2014, these rounds were renamed to simply the "first" and "second" rounds.

Since instituting the best-of-seven format for the 1939 Stanley Cup playoffs, 190 game sevens have been played. Of those, 79 have been won by the road team. There have been 19 seasons in which no game sevens were played: 1940, 1943, 1944, 1946, 1947, 1948, 1951, 1956, 1957, 1958, 1960, 1961, 1962, 1963, 1966, 1967, 1970, 1973, and 1977. In 2005, no playoffs were held due to the 2004–05 NHL lockout. The only active NHL franchises that has never played in a game seven are the Columbus Blue Jackets and Seattle Kraken. The 1994, 2011, and 2014 playoffs hold the record for most game sevens played, with seven out of a possible fifteen. The Boston Bruins have played in 29 game sevens in franchise history, the most of any team. The Bruins and Montreal Canadiens have won 15 game sevens each, the most of any teams in NHL history. The Toronto Maple Leafs, Colorado Avalanche, Boston Bruins, and Los Angeles Kings hold the record for most game sevens played in a single season, having played three in 1993, 2002, 2011, and 2014, respectively. The Bruins and Kings won all three.

Key

All-time game sevens

All-time standings

Recurring game seven matchups
(*) – Number of overtime periods played in the seventh game.

Notes

References

Game Sevens
Game Sevens
Game Sevens